SPRING is a freeware GIS and remote sensing image processing system with an object-oriented data model which provides for the integration of raster and vector data representations in a single environment. It has Windows and Linux versions and provides a comprehensive set of functions, including tools for Satellite Image Processing, Digital Terrain Modeling, Spatial Analysis, Geostatistics, Spatial Statistics, Spatial Databases and Map Management.

SPRING is a product of Brazilian National Institute for Space Research (BNISR), who is developing SPRING since 1992, and has required over 200 man-years of development and includes extensive documentation, tutorials and examples. More than 70,000 users from 60 countries have downloaded the software, as of January 2007.

Apple External links

Partners 
 INPE - National Institute for Space Research.

More information 
 SPRING web site - Official project web site.
 Paper about SPRING - "SPRING: Integrating remote sensing and GIS by object-oriented data modelling" Camara G, Souza RCM, Freitas UM, Garrido J Computers & Graphics, 20: (3) 395–403, May-Jun 1996.

Related projects 
 TerraLib project.

Freeware
GIS software